Vice Admiral Sir Charles Fred Wivell Norris KBE CB DSO (16 December 1900 – 17 December 1989) was a Royal Navy officer who went on to be Commander-in-Chief, Far East Fleet.

Naval career
Norris joined the Royal Navy in 1913. He served in World War I and took part in the Battle of Jutland in 1916. After the War he became a student at Cambridge University.

He took part in the Normandy landings on Omaha Beach in 1944 and in the Murmansk Convoys in the Winter 1944 to 1945.

In 1948 he became Captain of the Fleet for the Home Fleet and in 1950 he was appointed Director of Naval Training and Deputy Chief of Naval Personnel, (Training) at the Admiralty. He was made Flag Officer Flotillas, Mediterranean, at Malta in 1953 and Commander-in-Chief, East Indies in 1954; he retired in 1956.

In retirement he became a Director of the British Productivity Council.

References

Further reading
 "Vice-Admiral Sir Charles Norris", The Times (London), 4 January 1990, p. 14.

1900 births
1989 deaths
Royal Navy vice admirals
Knights Commander of the Order of the British Empire
Companions of the Order of the Bath
Companions of the Distinguished Service Order